Fred can be a given name or a surname.

Given name
Fred can be an either a given name in its own right or the diminutive form of the given names Frederick, Alfred, Manfred, or Wilfred.

Mononym
 Fred (cartoonist) (1931–2013), pen name of French comics creator Fred Othon Aristidès
 Fred (footballer, born 1979) Helbert Frederico Carreiro da Silva, Brazilian footballer
 Fred (footballer, born 1983) Frederico Chaves Guedes, Brazilian footballer
 Fred (footballer, born 1986) Frederico Burgel Xavier, Brazilian footballer
 Fred (footballer, born 1993) Frederico Rodrigues de Paula Santos, Brazilian footballer
 Fred la marmotte (Fred the groundhog), Canadian groundhog who predicts weather on Groundhog Day

A
 Fred Aandahl (disambiguation), multiple people
 Fred Abbott (1874–1935), American baseball catcher
 Fred Abel (1903–1980), American football player
 Fred Abraham Jr. (1886–1918), British Guianese cricketer
 Fred Abraham Sr. (1859–?), British Guianese cricketer
 Fred Achelam (born 2001), Ugandan cricketer
 Fred Acorn (born 1961), former American football defensive back
 Fred Adams (born 1961), American astrophysicist
 Fred Agabashian (1913–1989), American racer of midget cars and Indy cars
 Fred Agbedi, educationist and politician from Nigeria
 Fred Again, British singer, songwriter, multi-instrumentalist, record producer, and remixer
 Fred Agius (born 1984), Australian footballer
 Fred Agnich (1913–2004), American geophysicist and politician
 Fred Ah Kuoi (born 1956), New Zealand rugby league player
 Fred Ahern (disambiguation), multiple people
 Fred Ainsworth (1894–1981), English footballer
 Fred Ajudua, Nigerian criminal accused of being an advance-fee fraud scammer
 Fred Akers (1938–2020), American football player and coach
 Fred Åkerström (1937–1985), Swedish folk guitarist and singer
 Fred Akshar, American Republican politician
 Fred Akuffo (1937–1979), Ghanaian soldier and politician
 Fred Albin (1902–1965), American sound engineer
 Fred Alder (1889–1960), Australian rules footballer
 Fred Alderman (1905–1998), American sprint runner and gold medalist
 Fred Aldrich (1904–1979), American character actor of both film and television
 Fred Alexander (1880–1969), American tennis player
 Fred Alexander (disambiguation), multiple people
 Fred Allandale (1872–1921), British musical comedy actor, comedian, and producer
 Fred Allen (1894–1956), American comedian
 Fred Allen (disambiguation), multiple people
 Fred Alley (1962–2001), American musical theatre lyricist and librettist
 Fred Allison (1882–1974),  American physicist
 Fred Alsop (born 1938), British long jumper
 Fred Anderson (disambiguation), multiple people
 Fred Andrade, Brazilian musician and composer
 Fred Andrews (disambiguation), multiple people
 Fred Andrus (1850–1937), American baseball outfielder and pitcher
 Fred Anhalt (1896–1996), American architect
 Fred Anton (born 1934), American businessman from Pennsylvania
 Fred Apostoli (1913–1973), American boxer
 Fred Appleby (1879–1956), British long-distance runner
 Fred Applegate (1879–1968), American baseball pitcher
 Fred Applegate (actor) (born 1953), American actor, dancer, and singer
 Fred Appleyard (1874–1963), British landscape artist
 Fred Appleyard (footballer) (1909–1995), English footballer
 Fred Arbanas (1939–2021), American football player
 Fred Arbinger (born 1957), German footballer
 Fred Archer (disambiguation), multiple people
 Fred Armisen (born 1966), American actor, screenwriter, producer, director, and musician
 Fred Armstrong, American professional soccer goalkeeper
 Fred Arthur (born 1961), Canadian ice hockey player
 Fred Ascani (1917–2010), American major general and Air Force test pilot
 Fred Ashworth (1907–?), English rugby league footballer
 Fred Astaire (1899–1987), American film and Broadway stage dancer
 Fred Atkinson (1900–1902), American Director of Education in the Philippines
 Fred Atkinson (footballer) (1919–1991), English footballer
 Fred Auckenthaler (1899–1946), Swiss ice hockey player
 Fred Avey (1909–1999), English footballer
 Fred Ayers (1912–1986), Australian rules footballer
 Fred C. Ainsworth (1852–1934), surgeon in the United States Army
 Fred M. Ahern (1884–1950), American lawyer and politician

B
 Fred Bachrach (1914–2009), Dutch literary and art historian
 Fred Backway (1913–1995), Australian rules footballer
 Fred Bacon (1890s), British runner
 Fred Baczewski (1926–1976), American baseball player
  (1934–2009), American mayor of Pineville, Louisiana
 Fred Baer (1932–2007), American football player
 Fred Bailey (1895–1972), American baseball player
 Fred Baker (disambiguation), multiple people
 Fred Bakewell (1908–1983), English cricketer
 Fred Ball (1915–2007), American movie studio executive and actor
 Fred Ball (footballer) (1868–1902), Australian rules footballer
 Fred J. Balshofer (1877–1969), American silent film director, producer, screenwriter, and cinematographer
 Fred B. Balzar (1880–1934), American politician and Governor of Nevada
 Fred Bamford (1849–1934), Australian politician
 Fred Bamford (footballer) (1887–1955), Australian rules football player
 Fred Bankhead (1912–1972), American baseball player
 Fred Banks (born 1962), American football wide receiver
 Fred A. Bantz (1895–1982), American Department of Navy official
 Fred Barakat (1939–2010), American basketball coach
 Fred Barber (born 1963), English footballer
 Fred Bardshar (1915–1993), American World War II air ace
 Fred Baring (1890–1961), Australian rules footballer
 Fred Barker (1901–1935), American bank robber
 Fred Barker (footballer) (1903–1974), Australian rules footballer
 Fred Barnard (1846–1896), English illustrator, caricaturist and genre painter
 Fred Barnes (disambiguation), multiple people
 Fred Barnett (born 1966), American football player
 Fred Barnett (born 1966), English professional footballer
 Fred Baron (disambiguation), multiple people
 Fred Barr (1882–1922), American trailblazer
 Fred Barratt (1894–1947), English cricketer
 Fred Barrett (disambiguation), multiple people
 Fred Barry (born 1948), American former football player
 Fred Bartram (1869–1948), New Zealand Member of Parliament
 Fred Basolo (1920–2007), American inorganic chemist
 Fred Bassetti (1917–2013), American architect
 Fred Bateman (1937–2012), economic historian
 Fred Baur (1918–2008), American chemist and food storage technician
 Fred Baxter (born 1971),  American football player
 Fred Beckey (1923–2017), American mountaineer and rock climber
 Fred Berry (1951–2003), American actor
 Fred Bosman (born 1944), Dutch pathologist
 Fred Bradshaw (born 1951), Canadian politician
 Fred C. Brannon (1901–1954), American film director
 Fred Brown (disambiguation), multiple people
 Fred Aghogho Brume (1942–2011), politician
 Fred Brumm (1887–1946), American football player

C
 Fred Carr (1946–2018), American football linebacker
 Fred Carreiro (born 1979), Brazilian footballer
 Fred Campos (born 1984), Brazilian footballer
 Fred Clark (disambiguation), multiple people
 Fred Clarke (disambiguation), multiple people
 Fred Coby (1916–1970), American character actor
 Fred Cone (disambiguation), multiple people
 Fred Cook (disambiguation), multiple people
 Fred Curatolo (born 1958), Canadian freelance editorial cartoonist
 Fred Couples, American professional golfer

D
 Fred Davis (disambiguation), multiple people
 Fred De Bruyne (1930–1994), Belgian champion cyclist
 Fred De Palma (born 1989), Italian rapper
 Fred Dibnah (1938–2004), British industrial archaeologist and broadcaster
 Fred Dinenage (born 1942), English newsreader and broadcaster
 Fred Durst, vocalist of Limp Bizkit

E
 Fred Elder ( 1968–1976), race car owner
 Fred Elliott (disambiguation), multiple people
 Fred Ellis (disambiguation), multiple people

F
 Fred Fisher (1875–1942), American songwriter
 Fred Fisher (disambiguation), multiple people
 Fred Ford (disambiguation), multiple people
 Fred A. Fredrich (1870–1954)
 Fred Funk, American professional golfer

G
 Fred Gallagher (disambiguation), multiple people
 Fred Gause (1879–1944) Justice of the Indiana Supreme Court
 Fred Gibson (disambiguation), multiple people
 Fred Glover (disambiguation), multiple people
 Fred Goldsmith (disambiguation), multiple people
 Fred Graham (disambiguation), multiple people
 Fred Gray (disambiguation), multiple people
 Fred Green (disambiguation), multiple people
 Fred Guttenberg (born 1960s), American activist against gun violence

H
 Fred Haise (born 1933), American aeronautical engineer, test pilot, and NASA astronaut
 Fred Harvey Harrington (1912–1995), American educator and University President
 Fred Harris (disambiguation), multiple people
 Fred Harrison (disambiguation), multiple people
 Fred Hartley (1905–1980), Scottish pianist, conductor and composer
 Fred A. Hartley Jr. (1902–1969), American politician from New Jersey
 Fred Harvey (disambiguation), multiple people
 Fred A. Henderich (1879–1941), architect
 Fred Hill (disambiguation), multiple people
 Fred Hilton (born 1948), American basketball player
 Fred Hoey (1885–1949), American baseball broadcaster
 Fred Hoey (baseball manager) (1865–1933), American baseball manager
 Fred Holliday (disambiguation), multiple people
 Fred Nall Hollis (born 1948), American artist
 Fred Hollows (1929–1993), Australian Ophthalmologist and philanthropist
 Fred W. Hooper (1897–2000), American Thoroughbred racehorse owner and breeder
 Fred A. Howland (1864–1953), Vermont attorney, businessman, and Republican politician
 Fred Hunt (disambiguation), multiple people

J
 Fred Jackson (disambiguation), multiple people
 Fred Johnson (disambiguation), multiple people
 Fred Jones (disambiguation), multiple people

K
 Fred Karno (1866–1941), English theatre impresario of the British music hall
 Fred Kaplan (disambiguation), multiple people
 Fred Keller (disambiguation), multiple people
 Fred Kelly (disambiguation), multiple people
 Fred Kelsey (1884–1961), American actor, film director, and screenwriter
 Fred Kiprop (born 1974), Kenyan long-distance runner
 Fred J. Koenekamp (1922–2017), American cinematographer
 Fred Kohler (1888–1938), American actor
 Fred Krone (1930–2010), American actor and stuntman

L
 Fred Lane (disambiguation), multiple people
 Fred Lawless, British playwright
 Fred Luddy (born 1954/1955), American billionaire founder of ServiceNow
 Fred Luter (born 1956), African-American president of the Southern Baptist Convention
 Fred Lyon (1924–2022), American photographer

M
 Fred MacAulay (born 1956), Scottish comedian
 Fred H. Madden (born 1954), American politician from New Jersey
 Fred Matiang'i, Kenyan academic and secretary
 Fred Mavin (1884–1957), English footballer and manager
 Fred Meyer (disambiguation), multiple people
 Fred Miller (disambiguation), multiple people
 Fred Momotenko (born 1970), composer
 Fred Moore (disambiguation), multiple people
 Fred Morris (disambiguation), multiple people
 Fred Morrison (born 1963), Scottish musician
 Fred "Curly" Morrison (born 1926), American football player
 Fred A. Mueller (1868–?), member of the Wisconsin State Assembly
 Fred Mundee (1913–1990), American football player
 Fred Murphy (disambiguation), multiple people

N
 Fred Naumetz (1922–1998), American footballer
 Fred Negro (born 1959), Australian satirist, musician, songwriter, and cartoonist
 Fred Negus (1923–2005), American footballer 
 Fred Neher (1903–2001), American cartoonist
 Fred Neil (1936–2001), American singer-songwriter
 Fred Nesser (1897–1967), American footballer 
 Fred Neufeld (1869–1945), Polish physician 
 Fred Neulander (born 1941), Reform rabbi
 Fred Newhouse (born 1948), American former sprinter
 Fred Newman (disambiguation), multiple people
 Fred Newton (disambiguation), multiple people
 Fred Niblo (1874–1948), American film actor, director, and producer
 Fred Niblo Jr. (1903–1973), American screenwriter
 Fred Nicholas (1893–1962), English cricketer
 Fred Nicholson (rugby union) (1885–?), Australian rugby union player
 Fred Nicholson (1894–1972), American baseball player
 Fred Nickson (1919–?), English former footballer
 Fred Nicole (born 1970), Swiss rock climber
 Fred Nidd (1869–1956), English footballer
 Fred Nile (born 1934), Australian politician
 Fred Nixon (Australian footballer) (1874–1933), Australian rules footballer
 Fred Nixon (born 1958), American former wide receiver
 Fred Nøddelund (1947–2016), Norwegian jazz musician, music arranger, record producer, and bandleader
 Fred Nolting (born 1932), American politician 
 Fred Nomens (1869–1953), Australian rules footballer
 Fred Noonan (1893–1937), American flight navigator, sea captain, and aviation pioneer
 Fred Norcross (1884–1965), American footballer, coach, and mining engineer
 Fred Norman (born 1942), American former baseball player 
 Fred B. Norman (1882–1947), American representative
 Fred Norris (born 1955), American radio personality
 Fred Norton (1928–2000), American politician, speaker, and judge
 Fred Noseworthy (1871–1942), Canadian track and field athlete

P
 Fred Penner (born 1946), Canadian children's music performer
 Fred Peters (politician) (1867–1935), Dutch-American politician and mayor of Murray, Utah
 Fred Peters (artist) (1923–2018), American comic book artist
 Fred Phelps (1929–2014), head of the controversial Westboro Baptist Church

R
 Fred Rice (1918–2005), American football coach
 Fred Robinson (disambiguation), multiple people
 Fred Rogers (1928–2003), host of Mister Rogers' Neighborhood
 Fred Rose (disambiguation), multiple people
 Fred Rosen (disambiguation), multiple people
 Frederico Rodrigues Santos (born 1993)

S
 Fred Sanford (disambiguation), multiple people
 Fred A. Seaton (1909–1974), American Secretary of the Interior
 Fred Jay Seaver (1877–1970), American mycologist
 Fred R. Shapiro, American editor
 Fred Sherman (disambiguation), multiple people
 Fred Shields (disambiguation), multiple people
 Fred Sinowatz (1929–2008), Austrian politician
 Fred Slaughter (1942–2016), American basketball player and sports agent
 Fred Albert Shannon (1893–1963), American historian
 Fred Shook (1919–1992), American football player
 Fred Small (disambiguation), multiple people
 Fred Smith (disambiguation), multiple people
 Fred Stafford (1926–2009), Australian Rules footballer
 Fred Stringer (1914–1916), English football manager

T
 Fred Taylor (disambiguation), multiple people
 Fred Thomas (disambiguation), multiple people
 Fred Thompson (1942–2015), American politician
 Fred Toones (1906–1962), African-American film actor
 Fred Tuttle (1919–2003), American farmer from Vermont who ran for the U.S. Senate, largely under the name Fred

V
 Fred Vail, American football, basketball, and baseball coach
 Fred Valentine (disambiguation), multiple people
 Fred VanVleet (born 1994), American basketball player 
 Fred Vargas (born 1957), French historian, archaeologist, and novelist
 Fred Vaughan (1904–1986), American football player
 Fred Vaughn (1918–1964), American baseball player
 Fred Venturelli (1917–1990), American football player 
 Fred Vinson (disambiguation), multiple people
 Fred Vulliamy (1913–1968), Canadian chartered accountant and politician

W
 Fred Waring (1900–1984), American popular musician, bandleader and radio-television personality
 Fred M. Warner (1865–1923), Governor of the U.S. state of Michigan
 Fred Warner (baseball) (1855–1886), American baseball player
 Fred Warner (American football) (born 1996), American football player
 Fred Waters (1927–1989), American baseball player
 Fred Waters (American football) (1878–1943), American football player
 Fred Weber, vocalist for the new wave band Devo
 Fred Webster (disambiguation), multiple people
 Fred West (1941–1995), British serial killer
 Fritz Wetherbee (Fred M. Wetherbee II, "Fritz" is a nickname, born 1936), TV storyteller and author
 Fred Wilcox (disambiguation), multiple people
 Fred Williams (1927–1982), Australian painter
 Fred Williams (disambiguation), multiple people
 Fred Wilson (disambiguation), multiple people
 Fred Wise (disambiguation), multiple people
 Fred Wolf (disambiguation), multiple people
 Fred Wright (disambiguation), multiple people

Z
 Fred Zinneman, Austrian-American film director

Variations

Ffred
Ffred Ffransis (born 1948), Welsh activist and linguist
Alun Ffred Jones (born 1949), Welsh politician

Fredd
Fredd Atkins (born 1952), American politician
Fredd Wayne (1924–2018), American actor
Fredd Young (born 1961), American football player

Surname
Fred is also found as a surname.

 Dominique Fred (born 1992), Vanuatuan footballer
 Edwin Broun Fred (1887–1981), American bacteriologist
 Jalo Aatos Fred (1917–2003), Finnish chess player
 John Fred (1941–2005), American musician

Characters
 Coconut Fred, title character from the animated series Coconut Fred's Fruit Salad Island
 Drop Dead Fred, title character of the '91 black comedy cult film Drop Dead Fred
 Freaky Fred, a character from the animated series Courage the Cowardly Dog
 Fred, eponymous character of Ferry Boat Fred
 Fred, a character in the 2021 Canadian-American movie Mister Sister
 Fred, a character in the American sitcom television series Roseanne
 Fred, a character in the films Cars and Cars 2
 Fred, a character from the indie game Them's Fightin' Herds
 Fred the Admin, a deceased character from season 2 of the video game Minecraft: Story Mode
 Fred Basset, a comic book dog
 Fred Claus, title character in the film Fred Claus
 Fred Elliott, a character from the soap opera Coronation Street
 Fred Figglehorn, a YouTube character created and portrayed by Lucas Cruikshank
 Fred Flintstone, the main character from the animated sitcom The Flintstones
 Fred Fonseca, a character from the soap opera EastEnders
 Fred Fredburger, a character from the animated TV series Billy and Mandy
 Fred VII, a character from the comic book G.I. Joe: A Real American Hero
 Fred Jones (Scooby-Doo), a supporting character from the animated series Scooby-Doo
 Fred Kwon, highest paid member of the Surprise Party
 Fred Leblanc, a main character from the animated series Fred's Head
 Fred Mertz, a character from the sitcom I Love Lucy
 Fred Peterson, a character from the American TV sitcom Get a Life (1990–1992)
 Fred G. Sanford, a character from the sitcoms Sanford and Son and Sanford
 Fred Weasley, a character from the Harry Potter series
 Fred, the Undercover Kitten
 Fredzilla, a character from the comic book series Big Hero 6, as well as the Disney film of the same name
 Fred, a squirrel in The Penguins of Madagascar

See also

 
 
 Fred (disambiguation)

 Alfred (name)
 Federico
 Freddy (given name)
 Frédéric
 Frederick (given name)
 Frederico
 Fredrik
 Fredro
 Freek (given name)
 Friedrich (given name)
 Fryderyk (given name)

English masculine given names